"Hospital for Hire" (also known as "The National Health Service" and "Doctors") is an episode of the British comedy television series The Goodies. Written by The Goodies, with songs and music by Bill Oddie.

Plot
The National Health Service is having problems, and the Goodies are disgusted with the poor services. In a frustrated response to their criticisms, the National Health Service suggests to them that they study medicine and become doctors themselves in order to improve things. As a result, the Goodies become doctors.  They pass all the tests — including beer drinking and nurse chasing.

Later, Graeme develops a special tonic and the Goodies sell it at a medicine show.  They also set up their own eccentric outdoor hospital, performing X-rays (one scene shows Graeme being frightened and running away at the sight of a skeleton emerging from behind the X-ray machine) and operations, as well as setting bones and delivering babies.

The Goodies become obsessed with curing people, and collect patients from all over, including a patient from the back of an ambulance.  Soon, all of Britain is cured by Graeme's tonic.  Even a mummy, in a museum, is brought back to life by Graeme's tonic.

When the Goodies later become ill, they discover that curing the nation from sickness has unexpected disadvantages.

References

 The Complete Goodies — Robert Ross, B T Batsford, London, 2000
 The Goodies Rule OK — Robert Ross, Carlton Books Ltd, Sydney, 2006
 From Fringe to Flying Circus — Celebrating a Unique Generation of Comedy 1960-1980 — Roger Wilmut, Eyre Methuen Ltd, 1980
 The Goodies Episode Summaries — Brett Allender
 The Goodies — Fact File — Matthew K. Sharp

External links
 

The Goodies (series 4) episodes
1973 British television episodes
Television episodes set in hospitals
National Health Service